Giacobetti is an Italian surname. Notable people with the surname include:

Olivia Giacobetti (born 1966), French perfumer
Tata Giacobetti (1922–1988), Italian singer

See also
Giacometti (surname)

Italian-language surnames
Patronymic surnames
Surnames from given names